"Goin' Gone" is a song written by Pat Alger, Bill Dale and Fred Koller, and recorded by American country music artist Kathy Mattea.  It was released in September 1987 as the first single from the album Untasted Honey.  The song was Mattea's ninth country hit and the first of four number one country singles.  The single went to number one for one week and spent fifteen weeks on the country chart.

The song was initially recorded in 1985 by Nanci Griffith, and included on her album The Last of the True Believers.  Songwriter Pat Alger played guitar on both Griffith's and Mattea's albums, and recorded his own version for his 1991 album, True Love & Other Short Stories.  Other artists recording the song include Rhonda Vincent, who included it on her 1990 album, A Dream Come True.

Charts

Weekly charts

Year-end charts

References

1987 singles
1985 songs
Nanci Griffith songs
Kathy Mattea songs
Songs written by Pat Alger
Songs written by Fred Koller
Song recordings produced by Allen Reynolds
Mercury Records singles